Ergotism (pron.  ) is the effect of long-term ergot poisoning, traditionally due to the ingestion of the alkaloids produced by the Claviceps purpurea fungus—from the Latin  "club" or clavus "nail" and  for "head", i.e. the purple club-headed fungus—that infects rye and other cereals, and more recently by the action of a number of ergoline-based drugs. It is also known as ergotoxicosis, ergot poisoning, and Saint Anthony's fire.

Signs and symptoms
The symptoms can be roughly divided into convulsive symptoms and gangrenous symptoms.

Convulsive

Convulsive symptoms include painful seizures and spasms, diarrhea, paresthesias, itching, mental effects including mania or psychosis, headaches, nausea and vomiting. Usually the gastrointestinal effects precede central nervous system effects.

Gangrenous
The dry gangrene is a result of vasoconstriction induced by the ergotamine-ergocristine alkaloids of the fungus. It affects the more poorly vascularized distal structures, such as the fingers and toes. Symptoms include desquamation or peeling, weak peripheral pulses, loss of peripheral sensation, edema and ultimately the death and loss of affected tissues. Vasoconstriction is treated with vasodilators.

Causes

Historically, eating grain products, particularly rye, contaminated with the fungus Claviceps purpurea was the cause of ergotism.

The toxic ergoline derivatives are found in ergot-based drugs (such as methylergometrine, ergotamine or, previously, ergotoxine). The deleterious side effects occur either under high dose or when moderate doses interact with potentiators such as erythromycin.

The alkaloids can pass through lactation from mother to child, causing ergotism in infants.

Identification of agent

Dark-purple or black grain kernels, known as ergot bodies, can be identifiable in the heads of cereal or grass just before harvest. In most plants the ergot bodies are larger than normal grain kernels, but can be smaller if the grain is a type of wheat.

Prevention
Removal of ergot bodies is done by placing the yield in a brine solution; the ergot bodies float, while the healthy grains sink. Infested fields must be deep-ploughed; ergot cannot germinate if buried more than one inch (2.5 cm) in soil and therefore will not release its spores into the air. Rotating crops using non-susceptible plants helps reduce infestations, since ergot spores live only one year. Crop rotation and deep tillage, such as deep mold-board ploughing, are important components in managing ergot, as many cereal crops in the 21st century are sown with a "no-till" practice (new crops are sown directly into the stubble from the previous crop to reduce soil erosion). Wild and escaped grasses and pastures can be mown before they flower to help limit the spread of ergot.

Chemical controls can also be used but are not considered economical, especially in commercial operations, and germination of ergot spores can still occur under favourable conditions even with the use of such controls.

History

Epidemics of the disease were identified throughout history, though the references in classical writings are inconclusive. Rye, the main vector (route) for transmitting ergotism, was not grown much around the Mediterranean. When Fuchs separated references to ergotism from erysipelas and other conditions in 1834, he found the earliest reference to ergotism in the Annales Xantenses for the year 857: "a great plague of swollen blisters consumed the people by a loathsome rot, so that their limbs were loosened and fell off before death".

In the Middle Ages the gangrenous poisoning was known as "holy fire" or "Saint Anthony's fire", named after monks of the Order of St. Anthony, who were particularly successful at treating this ailment. According to Snorri Sturluson, in his Heimskringla, King Magnus II of Norway, son of King Harald Sigurtharson, who was the half-brother of Saint King Olaf Haraldsson, died from ergotism shortly after the Battle of Hastings. The 12th-century chronicler Geoffroy du Breuil of Vigeois recorded the mysterious outbreaks in the Limousin region of France, where the gangrenous form of ergotism was associated with the local Saint Martial. Likewise, an outbreak in Paris around 1129 was reported to be cured by the relics of Saint Genevieve, a miracle commemorated in the 26 November "Feast of the Burning Ones".

The blight, named cockspur owing to the appearance of infected grains, was identified and named by Denis Dodart, who reported the relation between ergotized rye and bread poisoning in a letter to the French Royal Academy of Sciences in 1676 (John Ray mentioned ergot for the first time in English the next year). "Ergotism", in this modern sense, was first recorded in 1853.

Notable epidemics of ergotism occurred into the 19th century. Fewer outbreaks have occurred since then owing to rye being carefully monitored in developed countries. However, a severe outbreak of something akin to ergot poisoning occurred in the French village of Pont-Saint-Esprit in 1951, resulting in five deaths. The outbreak and the diagnostic confusion surrounding it are vividly described in John Grant Fuller's book The Day of St Anthony's Fire.

Ergot sclerotiums were found in the gut of the Grauballe Man, a bog body dated the late 3rd century BC.

When milled, the ergot is reduced to a red powder, obvious in lighter grasses but easy to miss in dark rye flour. In less wealthy countries, ergotism still occurs; an outbreak in Ethiopia occurred in mid-2001 from contaminated barley. Whenever there is a combination of moist weather, cool temperatures, delayed harvest in lowland crops and rye consumption, an outbreak is possible.

Poisonings due to consumption of seeds treated with mercury compounds are sometimes misidentified as ergotism. Simon Cotton of the Chemistry Department of Uppingham School, UK, said that there have been numerous cases of mass-poisoning due to consumption of mercury-treated seeds.

Salem witchcraft accusations
The convulsive symptoms from ergot-tainted rye may have been the source of accusations of bewitchment that spurred the Salem witch trials. This medical explanation for the theory of "bewitchment" was first propounded by Linnda R. Caporael in 1976 in an article in Science. In her article, Caporael argues that the convulsive symptoms, such as crawling sensations in the skin, tingling in the fingers, vertigo, tinnitus aurium, headaches, disturbances in sensation, hallucination, painful muscular contractions, vomiting, and diarrhea, as well as psychological symptoms, such as mania, melancholia, psychosis, and delirium, were all symptoms reported in the Salem witchcraft records. Caporael also states that there was an abundance of rye in the region, as well as climate conditions that could support the tainting of rye. In 1982, historian Mary Matossian raised Caporael's theory in an article in American Scientist, in which she argued that symptoms of "bewitchment" resemble the ones exhibited in those affected by ergot poisoning.

The hypothesis that ergotism could explain cases of bewitchment has been subject to debate and has been criticized by several scholars. Within a year of Caporael's article, historians Spanos and Gottlieb argued against the idea in the same journal. In Spanos and Gottlieb's rebuttal to Caporael's article, they concluded that there are several flaws in the explanation. For example, they argued that, if the food supply were contaminated, the symptoms would have occurred by household, not individual. However, historian Leon Harrier said that even if supplies were properly cooked, residents with stomach ulcers had a risk of absorbing the toxin through the stomach lining, offering a direct route to the bloodstream. Being chemically similar to lysergic acid diethylamide (LSD), ergot would not survive in the acidic environment of a typical human's stomach, especially in properly cooked food. But if some but not all residents were malnourished and had bleeding stomach ulcers, only they could be affected by ingesting contaminated grains, leaving the majority unaffected, explaining why ergotism was not previously recognized. Harrier argued that the numbers could have been larger, possibly including the entire town, but due to the trials on bewitchment and heresy, and the fear of being accused and subsequently executed, few could come forward who had legitimate medical conditions.

Spanos and Gottlieb also state that ergot poisoning has additional symptoms not associated with the events in Salem and that the proportion of children affected was less than in a typical ergotism epidemic. Anthropologist H. Sidky noted that ergotism had been known for centuries before the Salem witch trials and argued that its symptoms would have been recognizable during the time of the Salem witch trials.

In 2003 it was pointed out that ergots produced by different strains of Claviceps purpurea, and those growing in different soils, may produce different ergot alkaloid compositions. This may explain the different manifestations of ergotism in different outbreaks. For example, an alkaloid present in high concentrations in ergots from Europe east of the Rhine may have caused convulsive ergotism, while ergot from the west caused epidemics of gangrenous ergotism.

See also
 Dancing plague of 1518
 Great Fear of 1789

References

External links 
 

Mass poisoning
Neurological disorders
Toxic effect of noxious substances eaten as food
Witchcraft